The Šešuvis is a river in western Lithuania and the main tributary of the Jūra River. Šešuvis begins  northwest of Raseiniai and flows mostly in the southwest direction. Its main tributaries are the Ančia, Šaltuona, Agluona, Žalpė, and Įkojis rivers. There are almost no lakes in Šešuvis' basin; therefore, its water level is subject to great seasonal fluctuations.

References

Rivers of Lithuania